Luna Blaise Boyd (born October 1, 2001) is an American actress and singer. She is best known for her role as Olive Stone in the NBC/Netflix sci fi drama series Manifest and Nicole Ellis in ABCs Fresh Off The Boat.

Early life
Blaise was born in Los Angeles, California. Her father is director Paul Boyd, from Glasgow, Scotland; and her mother, Angelyna Martinez-Boyd, is a second-generation Mexican-American actress from San Antonio, Texas.

Career

Early roles and recognition
Blaise began acting at the age of six with a cameo appearance in the 2008 film Vicious Circle.  In 2013, she was cast as Young Nina in the indie art film, Memoria, executive produced by James Franco, who also starred in the film.

In 2014, Blaise was cast in the recurring role of Nicole on the ABC television series Fresh Off the Boat starring Randall Park and Constance Wu as Louis and Jessica Huang.  She was 13 when the series started filming, and it was her first major role.  The role earned her an award for Best Recurring Young Actress at the 2016 Young Artist Awards.  In June 2016, Blaise starred in the music video of Jacob Sartorius' debut single "Sweatshirt".

Musical debut and Manifest
In early 2017, Blaise released her first single, "Over You", and announced in December 2017 she would be releasing new music in the new year. In late 2018, Blaise released her second single, "Secrets."

In 2018, Blaise was cast as Olive Stone in the NBC drama/mystery series Manifest. Blaise publicly announced in 2022 that she wouldn't be releasing any more music.

Filmography

Film

Television

Music videos

Awards and nominations

References

External links

American film actresses
Place of birth missing (living people)
Living people
2001 births
21st-century American actresses
Actresses from Los Angeles
American actresses of Mexican descent
American child actresses
American people of Scottish descent
American television actresses